The men's scratch competition at the 2023 UEC European Track Championships was held on 10 February 2023.

Results
First rider across the line without a net lap loss wins.

References

Men's scratch
European Track Championships – Men's scratch